Yvonne Domenge (1946-2019) was a Mexican artist.

Education

Born in Mexico City in 1946, Domenge studied plastic arts in Mexico City, Montreal, and Washington D.C. She took part in different workshops on painting, sculpture, and material techniques such as gilding, enameling and wood carving under the guidance of professors Kitzia Hofmann, Alberto Pérez Soria, and Somsy Smuthart. She studied Human Development at the Ibero-American University of Mexico City and taught children, teenagers, and adults artistic appreciation and art therapy through sculpture and drawing.

Works 

Over the last 35 years, Domenge's work focused on sculpture. She's had more than 40 individual exhibitions and took part in more than 160 collective shows in several cities across Mexico and around the world, in museums such as Museo de Arte Moderno in Mexico City, Museo de Arte Contemporáneo de Monterrey (MARCO) and The Louvre (Paris).

Her sculptures are featured in the collections of several Mexican museums including the Modern Art Museum INBA, the Chopo University Museum, the Universum Museum, and the Light Museum (Museo de la Luz) as well as in the State of Mexico's Modern Art Museum, Tijuana's Cultural Center, Manuel Felguérez Abstract Art Museum in Zacatecas and the History and Art Museum of Guanajuato. Domenge's sculptures are also included in several private and public cultural funds including Mexico's National Palace, National Institute of Nuclear Investigations at the State of Mexico, Energy Temixco Investigation Institute at UNAM, Morelos, Botanical Garden at Culiacan, Sinaloa, The Olympic Park's Sculptor Space of Matamoros, Tamaulipas, Mandarin Royal Playa del Carmen, Quintana Roo and Liverpool of Cuernavaca, Morelos.

Domenge designed the Children's Museum gardens in Xalapa, Veracruz. Her sculptures are also featured in the Ministry of Foreign Affairs building in Mexico City, the Chase Manhattan Bank, Hewlett-Packard, Televisa and the National Auditorium in Mexico City.

Her pieces can also be found in many teaching institutions: Monterrey Technological Superior Studies Institute at State of Mexico Campus Xochimilco's UAM University, Science and Technology National Library in the National Polytechnic Institute of Superior Studies Faculty Zaragoza UNAM in Mexico City.

Domenge's work can be found all over the globe, including the World Bank, Washington DC, The General Toyamura Center Abutagun in Hokkaido Island, Japan: PG & Energy Services Company and Novell, Inc., both in San Francisco, California ChevronTexaco in San Ramon, California; As well as in The House of Mexico in the Cité Universitaire, Paris.

Awards

She received the Acquisition Award Camille Claudel, La Bresse, France, International Second Place in Ice Art, Fairbanks, Alaska; EUROSCULPTURES Acquisition Award, Bardonecchia, Italy; Piece selected and purchased for the International Sculpture Biennial Toyamura ' 97, General Toyamura Center Abutagun in Hokkaido Island, Japan; First place in the Sixth Mexinox Latin American Industrial Design Award 1996, Mexico City, Mexico; As well as first place in Creativity in Steel, National Chamber of Iron and Steel, Woman's Achievement Award Parchment Sor Juana Ines de la Cruz 2003 "And the first place in the International Plastic Arts Contest" Converging Visions "CNN In Spanish. Artist selected for the Second Beijing International Art Biennial 2005, China.

Domenge's sculpture was selected and acquired by "The International Sculpture and Cultural Year of Zhengzhou" Henan, China and she was the Selected Sculptor for the International Olympic Sculptures Exhibition in Beijing 2008 - "Olympic Landscape Sculpture Design Contests and International Traveling Exhibition", China. She was also selected to represent Mexico in the International Sculpture Biennial in Vancouver 2008-2010. The Galería del Sur (South Gallery) of the UAM University is named after her.

Domenge was a member of the Consultative Commission of the Sculpture CONACULTA (National Cultural and Artistic Council) and she has been part of the Creators National System since 1997. She directed the project "Sculptures created by the Community of the Buenos Aires Neighborhood", a project supported by the Project Support and Cultural Coproduction Program since 1999.

On February 1, 2011, the city of Chicago announced that the April 6, 2011 – October 2012 Millennium Park Boeing Galleries, Large-Scale Sculptures Exhibition would feature the work of Domenge under the exhibition title "Interconnected: The Sculptures of Yvonne Domenge".

References 

1946 births
2019 deaths
20th-century Mexican sculptors
21st-century Mexican sculptors
20th-century Mexican women artists
21st-century Mexican women artists
Artists from Mexico City
Mexican women sculptors